Deerhead Township is a township in Barber County, Kansas, USA.  As of the 2000 census, its population was 11.

Geography

The stream of Inman Creek runs through this township.

References
 USGS Geographic Names Information System (GNIS)

External links
 City-Data.com

Townships in Barber County, Kansas
Townships in Kansas